Zhu Rongji (born 23 October 1928) is a retired Chinese politician who served as the premier of China from 1998 to 2003 and CCP Politburo Standing Committee member from 1992 to 2002 along with the Chinese Communist Party's general secretary Jiang Zemin. In his capacity as first vice premier and premier, Zhu was regarded as the leading figure behind China's economic policy in the 1990s and early 2000s. He also served as mayor of Shanghai from 1988 to 1991 and Communist Party secretary of Shanghai from 1989 to 1991. He served alongside CCP leader Jiang Zemin and had a testy relationship with Jiang. Zhu had a reputation as a tough but pragmatic administrator. During his office, China's economy saw double digit growth. Zhu was also much more popular than his predecessor Li Peng among the Chinese public. However, Zhu's opponents stipulate that his tough and pragmatic stance on policy was unrealistic and unnecessary, and many of his promises were left unfulfilled. Zhu retired in 2003 and has not been a public figure since.

Early life and career
Zhu Rongji was born in Changsha, Hunan, to a family of intellectuals and wealthy landowners. According to family tradition, his family was descended from Zhu Yuanzhang, the first emperor of the Ming dynasty. His father died before he was born, and his mother died when he was nine. Zhu was subsequently raised by his uncle, Zhu Xuefang, who continued to support Zhu's education.

Zhu was educated locally, and after graduation from high school he attended the prestigious Tsinghua University in Beijing. At Tsinghua he became a student leader and took part in activities organized by the Communist Party. He graduated with a degree in electrical engineering and joined the Chinese Communist Party (CCP) in 1949, the same year that the Communists captured Beijing, ended the Chinese Civil War, and declared the beginning of the People's Republic of China. In 1951 he became the chairman of the Tsinghua Student Union.

Zhu then began his career as a civil servant in the Northeast China Ministry of Industries, where he was appointed the deputy head of its production planning office. From 1952 to 1958 he worked in the State Planning Commission, where he was group head, deputy director, and deputy section chief. In 1957, during the Hundred Flowers Campaign, he criticized Mao Zedong economic policies, saying that they promoted "irrational high growth". His comments led to him being subsequently identified as a "rightist" in 1958, for which he was persecuted, demoted, disgraced, and thrown out of the Communist Party. In the late 1950s his family was also persecuted for their pre-revolutionary status as wealthy landowners, and their family mansion was destroyed.

After his persecution as a rightist, Zhu was sent to work at a remote cadre school. In 1962, following the famine and industrial collapse caused by the Great Leap Forward, Zhu was pardoned (but not politically rehabilitated), and assigned to work as an engineer at the National Economic Bureau of the State Planning Commission. During the Cultural Revolution Zhu was purged again. From 1970 to 1975, he was sent for "re-education" to a May Seventh Cadre School, a special farm for disgraced government workers and former Party members. During his five-year exile in the countryside Zhu was a manual laborer, raising pigs and cattle, carrying human waste, and planting rice.

Shortly after CCP Chairman Mao Zedong's death in 1976, Vice Premier Deng Xiaoping initiated economic and political reforms that led to Zhu's rehabilitation, and he returned to work in the government. From 1976 to 1979. he worked as an engineer in the Ministry of Petroleum Industry, and served as the director of the Chinese Academy of Social Sciences' Industrial Economic Bureau. In 1978, he was formally rehabilitated and allowed to rejoin the Communist Party. During the late 1970s, Zhu's positions were relatively low-profile, but after Deng consolidated his power in the 1980s and the government became more meritocratic, Zhu was promoted to work in increasingly demanding positions. He had few connections in the army, the Party, or the bureaucracy, and was able to rise through the ranks of the government mostly through his own skills. In 1979, he was reassigned to the State Economic Commission, where he served as vice-minister from 1983 to 1987.

After being politically rehabilitated and reentering the civil service, Zhu resumed connections with his alma mater, Tsinghua University. In 1984, he was named the founding dean of the Tsinghua University School of Economics and Management. He held his position as dean at Tsinghua for 17 years, throughout most of his subsequent public career. As he became increasingly able to meet and make connections with foreign academics and world leaders, he was able to promote a close academic relationship between Tsinghua and M.I.T. Later in his career, he gained a reputation as a mentor to subordinates, a habit that observers interpreted as a product of his position as an educator at Tsinghua.

Mayor and CCP secretary of Shanghai
In 1987, Zhu was promoted to work as the mayor of Shanghai, which was then China's largest, most industrially developed, and wealthiest city. During Zhu's term as mayor of Shanghai he oversaw large, rapid improvements in telecommunications, urban construction, and transportation, especially in Pudong, a large and high-profile Special Economic Zone.

It was during his time as Mayor of Shanghai that he developed a public reputation as a strong opponent of corruption, and a talented economic reformer. His efforts to simplify the process by which the government approved business deals earned him the nickname "One-Chop Zhu". In order to improve relations with the foreign business community and solicit outside advice, he formed an advisory committee composed of foreign businessmen. While working in Shanghai he began his long working relationship with subsequent CCP General Secretary Jiang Zemin (then party chief of Shanghai) which continued throughout Zhu's career.

He also became known while administering Shanghai for his strict adherence to law and Party discipline, and for his refusal to grant extrajudicial favours to those close to him. Once in 1988, when some family members asked him over dinner if he could bend China's residency (hukou) laws to allow them to move to Shanghai, he turned them down, responding: "What I can do, I have done already. What I cannot do, I will never do."

In 1989, when large-scale protests broke out in numerous cities around China, there were also large, well-organized protests in Shanghai. Unlike the government's violent crackdown of protesters in Beijing, Zhu was able to peacefully resolve the local situation. At one point a group of protesters derailed and burnt a train, for which several participants were arrested and executed, but there was otherwise little loss of life, and Zhu was able to retain significant public sympathy throughout the event. Following the violent resolution of the Tiananmen protests there was a brief struggle for control of the Chinese government within the Communist Party. Zhu was promoted to work as the Communist Party secretary of Shanghai in 1989. Zhu assisted Deng in regaining his prestige and authority by assisting Deng in organizing his 1992 Southern Inspection Tour.

In 1990, Zhu led a delegation of Chinese mayors to meet with local and national political and business leaders from the United States, attempting to maintain and improve political and business relationships which had been threatened following the suppression of the 1989 protests. Some of the officials Zhu met on the visit included Richard Nixon, Henry Kissinger, Bob Dole, and Nancy Pelosi. During the visit Zhu gave unscripted speeches in Chinese and English, and was praised by American journalists, politicians, and business leaders for his frankness, openness, energy, and technical background.

Although he demonstrated a desire and ability to enact large, thorough legal and economic reforms, and political reforms aimed at making the Chinese government more efficient and transparent, Zhu made it clear that he did not support dramatic political change. When asked by Western journalists in 1990 whether he was China's Gorbachev, he responded "No, I am China's Zhu Rongji".

Vice Premiership

Overview
In 1991, largely due to his success in managing the development of Shanghai, Zhu was promoted into the central government in Beijing, where he focused on planning and resolving economic projects and issues as the vice-premier of the State Council under Premier Li Peng and the director of the State Council Production Office. He also served concurrent terms as the governor of the central bank, overseeing monetary policy. His first issues after arriving in Beijing were to restructure the debts owed by state owned enterprises, and to simplify and streamline the process by which farmers sold their grain to the government. Zhu was able to enact relatively far-reaching reforms largely via the broad support of Deng Xiaoping, who noted that Zhu "has his own views, dares to make decisions, and knows economics." In comparing Zhu to his peers when considering his appointment, Deng said, "The current leadership do not know economics... Zhu Rongji is the only one who understands economics."

When a global recession occurred in 1992, China was challenged with excessive investment in fixed assets, excessive monetary supply, and chaotic financial markets. Inflation rates reached over 20%. As the director of the central bank and the vice-premier and head of the State Council Economic and Trade Office, Zhu resolved these issues by limiting monetary supply, eliminating duplicate low-tech industrial projects, devaluing the Chinese currency, cutting interest rates, reforming the tax system, and investing state capital in the transportation, agricultural, and energy sectors. He attempted to reform the state banking sector by introducing greater oversight to discourage reckless lending, introducing "asset management companies" to manage the many large, non-performing loans that many of China's banks had accumulated, and privatizing large banks in order to expose them to free market competition. Following Zhu's management, the Chinese economy was able to maintain stable growth and avoid dramatic price fluctuations. Zhu's ability to stabilize the economy led to his being named to the CCP Politburo Standing Committee at the 14th Party Congress in 1992, after which he also retained his other posts.

The most active opponent of Zhu's plans to reform the Chinese economy was Premier Li Peng. Li and Zhu clashed in the first two years following Zhu's appointment as vice-chairman; but, by the time that he suffered a heart attack in 1993, Li had lost influence within the government and was no longer able to block many of Zhu's reforms. That Zhu's reforms had quickly gained wide support within the central government was made clear at Li's confirmation process during the Party's 1992 convention: although Li's appointment was already agreed upon by China's top leadership, Zhu received a relatively large and unusual protest vote by many of the Party delegates. Throughout Zhu's term as both vice-premier and premier, Li was successful in blocking Zhu from introducing regulation or government oversight over China's power companies, and they remained private monopolies essentially run by Li's family throughout Zhu's term of office.

Zhu once used the term "patriotic organizations" in a speech in the mid-1990s to describe the triads, citing their history as secret societies in resisting foreign invaders and playing a key role in Chinese history. This was interpreted by some observers as indicating a cultural connection between the triads and the Communist Party.

Contributions to socialist market economy
Zhu and Deng's vision of China's future was not simply one of rapid growth. It included a programme of continuous reforms, which they believed would be necessary to achieve this growth. There were two major goals Zhu believed were necessary to achieve this vision, which Zhu began while serving as China's vice-premier. His first goal was to rationalize and centralize the fiscal and financial system. The second goal was to streamline and strengthen the state sector.

Zhu's first task was to regain central control over the country's burgeoning yet dangerously decentralized tax revenues. Before reforming China's tax system he went in person to each province in China to sell a new "tax sharing" idea modeled on the U.S. federal tax system. Under this new policy, revenue from provinces would go first to Beijing, and then the other portions would be returned to the provinces. Following the introduction of this tax system, the central government's cut of total revenue increased by over 20% in a single year, balancing the central budget and putting Beijing's resources on track to reliably increase over time. In order to manage China's financial affairs he appointed himself governor of the People's Bank of China with jurisdiction over monetary policy and financial regulations, bringing the highly decentralized banking system more closely under Beijing's control.

Zhu's next task was to deal with China's four colossal state-owned banks, which had accumulated billions of dollars in nonperforming loans due to profligate local lending to unprofitable state-owned enterprises (SOEs). He quarantined these bad loans in newly created "asset-management companies", and recapitalized the banks through government bonds in a restructuring strategy. After his promotion to premier in 1998, Zhu saved the biggest SOEs and allowed thousands of other small and medium-sized firms and factories to go under, assuming that new growth in the private sector could alleviate any surge of unemployment. This strategy resulted in millions of workers losing their "iron rice bowl" guarantees of cradle-to-grave employment, health care benefits, and pensions. Zhu challenged managers to base salaries on performance and market competitiveness and made profitability and productivity determining factors in managerial and executive promotions within surviving SOEs.

All these economic reform efforts by Zhu did not dismantle the state sector, but streamlined it with the goal of accomplishing Deng's new form of marketized socialism. Although many in the West were skeptical when Deng announced that he would pursue "socialism with Chinese characteristics," Zhu's reforms helped increase China's wealth and power while leaving it under the firm grip of the Communist Party.

Premiership

In a joint news conference with US president Bill Clinton, Zhu Rongji elucidated the Chinese position on three questions relating to Cross-Strait relations: i) the influence of United States Armed Forces on cross-strait relations; ii) whether there is a timetable for Chinese unification; iii) is he willing to visit Taiwan? Zhu answered that, regarding China's policy toward Chinese unification, he would not comment further and pointed to previous statements by CCP general secretary Jiang Zemin. He claimed that China had upheld the one country, two systems principle and preserved a high degree of autonomy in Hong Kong and compared Taiwan to Hong Kong, noting that China allows Taiwan to retain its own army, and was prepared to let the leader of Taiwan become the deputy leader of China in the event of unification.

Zhu's position on Taiwan changed over the course of his time as premier. During the 2000 ROC presidential election in Taiwan, Zhu warned Taiwanese voters not to vote for the DPP, which favors distancing Taiwan from China, stating, "those who are pro-Taiwan independence will not have a good ending." His attitude towards Taiwan changed after the election. Three years later, in his farewell speech to the National People's Congress in 2003, Zhu encouraged Chinese politicians to use softer language in discussing the issue of Mainland China-Taiwan relations, saying that Mainland China and Taiwan should improve economic, transportation, and cultural ties in order to improve their relationship. During the speech Zhu accidentally referred to China and Taiwan as "two countries" before quickly correcting himself and referring to them as "two sides". The incident was reported in Taiwanese media as a "gaffe".

Economic liberalization
Zhu was chosen to become China's fifth premier in March 1998, largely due to his success in managing large macroeconomic projects. During his term Zhu continued to focus on issues related to economic development. He generally favoured stable, sustainable development supported by robust macroeconomic control measures and a tight monetary policy. He continued to promote investment in China's industrial and agricultural sectors.

Early in his term he began a programme of privatization that lasted throughout his period in office, during which China's private sector experienced rapid growth. He responded to the 1997 Asian financial crisis by dramatically reducing the size of the state bureaucracy, maintaining strict capital controls, and through funding massive infrastructure projects. During the crisis he refused to devalue the Chinese yuan, and angrily defended his decision when some international leaders suggest that he do so. Following the crisis, Zhu advocated improving international financial markets in order to prevent harmful market speculation.

He was successful in reducing the size of the official bureaucracy by half by the end of his term in 2003, though the bureaucracies in districts far from the capital continued to expand, leading to increased tension between some local governments and the farmers whose income supports them. His reform of state-owned enterprises led to approximately 35% of their workforce, forty million workers, being laid off over five years.
Zhu introduced limited reforms in China's housing system, allowing residents to own their own apartments for the first time at subsidized rates.

By the end of Zhu's term as premier, the Chinese economy was stable and growing confidently. While foreign direct investment (FDI) worldwide halved in 2000, the flow of capital into mainland China rose by 10%. As global firms scrambled to avoid missing the China boom, FDI in China rose by 22.6% in 2002. While global trade stagnated, growing by one percent in 2002, mainland China's trade soared by 18% in the first nine months of 2002, with exports outstripping imports. he meets South Korea President Kim Dae-jung and Lee Hee-ho in 2001.

Anti-corruption initiatives
Zhu earned a reputation as a strong, strict administrator, intolerant of corruption, nepotism, or incompetence. In Beijing he was sometimes known by the nicknames "Madman Zhu" and "Boss Zhu" for his hard, transparent work ethic and his tendency to disregard the bureaucratic status quo. In addition to investigating individual examples of potential official corruption, Zhu attempted to make the Chinese government more regulated and transparent by increasing the number and powers of independent regulatory commissions, downsizing government bureaucracy, opening government positions to outside experts and reforming the government's system of hiring and promotion based on merit, and improving administrative predictability by strengthening the rule of law.

Before Zhu came to office, employment in China's bureaucracy was largely obtained via tenure and political connections. Zhu attempted to modernize the bureaucracy's seniority system and improve the government's ability to attract and retain talented workers by opening senior- and mid-level positions to public selection, and by reforming the civil service's examination system. He made a strong effort to attract and promote economists and technocrats from academia and the private sector to work under him as advisors in the central government, and was successful in attracting a small core of several dozen such officials to work under and advise him. By opening mid-level appointments to outside experts, he was able to ensure that the Chinese bureaucrats who were promoted during his term as premier were generally supportive of his ideas.

During his term as premier Zhu engaged in frequent large-scale efforts to fight official corruption. At one time he was reported to have read 16,000 letters a year, sent to him by aggrieved citizens, in order to get a better understanding of the circumstances of ordinary Chinese people. He made frequent official visits outside Beijing to inspect working conditions, especially in the south. Shortly after coming to office, in 1998, he required the People's Liberation Army to relinquish its involvement in business interests that had been making high-ranking officers and their children rich, and later barred civil servants from taking part in business enterprises. He attempted to introduce stricter, more formal oversight to keep provincial leaders from receiving kickbacks from businessmen and embezzling state funds.

Zhu's investigations into official corruption led to his discovery of numerous large-scale misdeeds by provincial officials. After discovering that 25.8 billion RMB allocated for the purchase of grain over six years had gone missing, he launched an investigation which concluding that at least 10 billion RMB had been instead used to construct hotels and luxury apartments, and on speculative business investments. In one inspection tour in 2001, Zhu uncovered the largest corruption ring in modern Chinese history, discovering that many of the highest-ranking officials in Fujian had conspired to operate a massive smuggling ring. In the resulting purge, numerous top-level Party leaders and governors were arrested and executed. On one inspection tour, after noticing that dikes had broken because funds allocated to their proper construction had been stolen by corrupt officials, he flew into a rage over such "son-of-a-bitch construction projects", which were not uncommon in China at the time. Referring to his efforts to fight corruption, he once said, "I will prepare 100 coffins for the corrupt, and one for me, for I will die of fatigue". Much of his efforts to increase the role of the private market in the economy, to improve legal protection for businesses, and to introduce a true commercial banking system were implicitly undertaken in the interest of reducing the kind of official corruption and waste that he uncovered through his personal investigations of government officials.

He took the lead in negotiating China's entry into the World Trade Organization, which the country achieved in 2001 to domestic and international acclaim. Joining the WTO opened China to increased foreign investment, but also required it to conform to international conventions of trade, intellectual property, and environmental management. Zhu expected that China's entry into the WTO would lead to economic expansion, but also hoped that entering the WTO would force economic and legal changes within China that Zhu himself had little power to implement.

Zhu, along with his successor Wen, attempted to set limits on the power of local officials to levy miscellaneous service charges and fees in order to protect farmers from indiscriminate taxation by corrupt officials.<ref>China.org.cn</ref>

Retirement
Zhu's premiership, especially related to free-market reforms, was controversial. He retired from his position as member of CCP Politburo Standing Committee in November 2002 and premier in March 2003 respectively, when he was replaced by Wen Jiabao. Wen was the only Zhu ally to appear on the subsequent nine-person CCP Politburo Standing Committee.

Among the international leaders he met and negotiated with as premier, he gained a reputation for intelligence, energy, impatience for incompetence, shrewdness, and as a person who must be respected, even among those who disliked him. Journalists noted his proficient command of English and his "disarming" sense of humor.

Personal life

Zhu Rongji has been recognized as a good public speaker and was notable during his career for his proficient command of English. He often made public speeches without the aid of a script, and when he did so his speeches were said to be entertaining and dramatic.

He enjoys literature, and has reportedly spent much of his retirement reading books he had no time to read while in office. He plays the erhu, an instrument similar to a two-stringed violin. He enjoys Peking Opera, and once appeared on stage as an actor in a performance.

His wife, Lao An, once served as the vice-chairman on the board of directors of China International Engineering and Consulting. She and Zhu attended two schools together, first at the Hunan First Provincial Middle School, then at Tsinghua University. They have two children, a son and a daughter. Their son, Zhu Yunlai, was born in 1957. He was once the president and chief executive officer of one of China's most successful investment banks, China International Capital Corp. Their daughter, Zhu Yanlai, was born in 1956. She is currently the assistant chief executive for the Bank of China (Hong Kong), and holds a seat in the National Committee of the Chinese People's Political Consultative Conference.

Legacy
Before his retirement Zhu publicly acknowledged that he had not been able to complete many of his desired reforms before his term ended. In 2003, he gave a 90-minute address to several thousand delegates in the Great Hall of the People, outlining the "outstanding difficulties and problems" which he expected his successor as premier, Wen Jiabao, would have to face. After Zhu retired, Wen attempted to continue many of the reforms that Zhu had conceived and designed, creating and increasing the powers of independent regulatory commissions and restructuring the bureaucracy on the basis of merit. Some of Zhu's reforms were reversed under the leadership of Hu Jintao, and other reforms he hoped would be addressed by the incoming administration were not implemented. Notably, state-owned enterprises were allowed to regrow and re-establish a dominant place in the Chinese economy, and large areas of the banking sector remained unregulated. Hu may have reversed the Chinese government's previous position and promoted state-owned enterprises in an effort to promote social stability. During Wen's term of office many of the reforms Zhu proposed were opposed by conservative government ministers, notably including the former commerce minister, Bo Xilai. Zhu's position as head of the central bank was given to one of his close associates, Zhou Xiaochuan, and Zhu's views retained some influence in China's financial sector following his retirement.

After his retirement, Zhu withdrew from any obvious involvement in Chinese politics, but he retained ties with Tsinghua University, where he continued to make numerous visits during ceremonies and special events. In 2014, he wrote a rare public letter for the 30th anniversary of Tsinghua School of Economics and Management, but was not able to attend due to poor health. In the letter, he encouraged the students at the prestigious business school to visit poor and rural areas of China, in order to better understand the conditions of most Chinese people.
He appeared at the funeral of Huang Ju on June 5, 2007.

Since he left office, Zhu has written and has been the subject of numerous books. Zhu's first book, Zhu Rongji Meets the Press, a collection of speeches and interviews with foreign and Chinese journalists and officials, was released in 2009 (an English translation of the book was released in 2011). A second book, Zhu Rongji's Answers to Journalists' Questions, a four-volume compilation of Zhu's speeches, articles, and letters, was also released in 2011. The second book was translated and published in English in 2013, under the title: Zhu Rongji on the Record: The Road to Reform. By the end of 2013 over six million copies of his books had been sold. Henry Kissinger wrote that the translation of his books into English represented a significant contribution to Sino-US relations and promoted international understanding of Chinese culture and politics. One Western biography of Zhu encouraged leaders in other developing countries to study and emulate his reforms, and compared his influence on practical economic theory to that of Keynes. Although he has published books compiled from his speeches and interviews, his daughter has reported that he has no interest in writing a memoir.

After retiring, Zhu invested much of his time and energy into public philanthropy. In 2013 and 2014 alone he donated 40 million RMB (c.$6.5 million US) to charity. The donated money reportedly came from the royalties from his books, and was given to a charitable foundation promoting education in poor rural areas. The amount of money given was considered unusual among retired Chinese politicians, leading to speculation about Chinese political culture. The donations prompted some commenters to compare his character to that of China's first premier, Zhou Enlai.

By the time he retired, Zhu had become noticeably more popular than his predecessor, Li Peng, both in China and abroad. Economists noted that during his time in office he had shown himself to be much better at economic management than Li Peng.

Zhu was well known for his efforts to fight official corruption, but was not able to contain official corruption in his term. Following the 18th CCP National Congress in 2012, one of Zhu's proteges, Wang Qishan, became the head of CCP's Central Commission for Discipline Inspection, the Communist Party's main organ in charge of investigating internal corruption. Zhu publicly supported CCP general secretary Xi Jinping's anti-corruption campaign in which Wang played a major role. He did not appear in the 70th anniversary of the PRC on October 1. 2019 22 days before his 91st birthday. He also did not appear in the 100 anniversary of the CCP on July 1, 2021. he was absent with the former CCP general secretary Jiang Zemin and former CCP Politburo member Luo Gan. He celebrated his 92nd birthday on October 23, 2020, during the COVID-19 pandemic.

In March 2022, according to a report published by The Wall Street Journal, Zhu voiced his opposition to current CCP General Secretary Xi Jinping seeking an unprecedented third consecutive term, as it would break the established party system of leadership succession.

See also

 History of the People's Republic of China (1989–2002)
 Macroeconomic regulation and control
 Politics of the People's Republic of China

 References 
 Citations 

 Sources 

 AP and Reuters. "China and Taiwan `Two Countries': Zhu".  Taipei Times. March 6, 2003. Retrieved August 2, 2015.
 Center on U.S.-China Relations. "Entering the World: Zhu Rongji" . Asia Society. 2015. Retrieved July 15, 2015.
 Barron, Oliver Blade. "Political Heavyweights Clash as China's Central Bank Head Said to Step Down" . Forbes. September 25, 2014. Retrieved July 28, 2015.
 Chen Zhenzhen. "Wen's Reforms: Following In The Footsteps Of Zhu Rongji". The Jamestown Foundation. 2015. Retrieved July 28, 2015.
 "Tax Reform for Farmers Hailed" . China.org.cn. July 23, 2001. Retrieved August 5, 2015.
 "The Man Who Took on the Dissidents: Li Peng (1928–)"  CNN.com.  2001.  Retrieved 21 August 2008.
 Dumbaugh, Kerry & Michael F. Martin. Understanding China's Political System . Congressional Research Service. December 31, 2009. Retrieved on July 14, 2015.
 "What He Did, and Left Undone: The Mixed Legacy of Zhu Rongji, China's Outgoing Prime Minister" . The Economist. March 6, 2003. Retrieved on July 14, 2015.
 Foley, John. "Zhu Rongji Merits China’s Admiration not Imitation". Reuters. August 14, 2014. Retrieved July 15, 2015.
 Kissinger, Henry & Schmidt, Helmudt. "Zhu Rongji on the Record The Road to Reform: 1991–1997" . Brookings. September 8, 2013. Retrieved July 15, 2015.
 Lai, Carol P. Media in Hong Kong: Press Freedom and Political Change, 1967–2005 . The USA and Canada: Routledge. 2007. Retrieved August 2, 2015.
 Lam, Willy.  "China's Elite Economic Double Standard".  Asia Times Online.  17 August 2007.  Retrieved July 28, 2015.
 LaMoshi, Gary. "The Mystery Behind Zhu's Miracle". Asia Times Online. February 22, 2003. Retrieved July 14, 2015.
 Lee, Khoon Choy. Pioneers of Modern China: Understanding the Inscrutable Chinese. Singapore: World Scientific Publishing. 2005. . Retrieved on July 14, 2015.
 Mackerras, Colin, Donald Hugh McMillen, and Donal Andrew Watson. Dictionary of the Politics of the People's Republic of China. Great Britain: Routelage. 1998. Retrieved 4 November 2011.
 Manthorpe, Jonathan. Forbidden Nation: A History of Taiwan . St. Martin's Press. 2008. . Retrieved August 8, 2015.
 McCarthy, Terry. "Zhu Rongji's Year of Living Dangerously" . TIME. April 12, 1999. Retrieved on June 14, 2014.
 "Zhu Rongji and the Chinese Mayors Delegation (1990)" . National Committee on United States-China Relations. 2015. Retrieved July 28, 2015.
 People's Daily. "Zhu Rongji--Premier of the State Council" . En.people.cn. Retrieved on July 14, 2015.
 Pesek, Willie. "China Needs Another Zhu Rongji" . The Japan Times. Retrieved July 14, 2015.
 Schell, Orville & John Delury. (2013). Wealth and Power: China's Long March to the Twenty-First Century. New York: Random House. 2013.
 Schmidt, Helmut. "Foreword". In Zhu Rongji. Zhu Rongji on the Record: 1991–1997. Beijing, China: Foreign Languages Press. 2013.
 Song, Yuwu. "Zhu Rongji (1928–)". Biographical Dictionary of the People's Republic of China. United States of America: McFarland & Company. 2013. . Retrieved on July 14, 2015.
 Thornton, John L. "Note from the Brooklings Institution" . In Zhu Rongji. Zhu Rongji on the Record: The Road to Reform 1989–2003. Beijing, China: Foreign Languages Press. 2015. Retrieved July 28, 2015.
 Wang, Yue. "Report:Zhu Yunlai, Son Of Former Chinese Premier Zhu Rongji, Leaves CICC" . Forbes. September 13, 2015. Retrieved July 14, 2015.
 Weatherley, Robert. Politics in China Since 1949: Legitimizing Authoritarian Rule. New York, NY: Routelage. 2006. . Retrieved on July 14, 2015.
 Wu Zhong. "Hu Hands China's Military Baton to Xi". Asia Times Online. November 16, 2012. Retrieved August 2, 2015.
 Yu, Jess Macy. "Former Chinese Premier Draws Praise for His Philanthropy" . The New York Times. February 23, 2013. Retrieved July 14, 2015.
 Zhang Hong. "Former Chinese Premier Zhu Rongji Breaks Long Silence with Letter to University: Rare Gesture from Ex-Party Leader Offers Glimpse of His Health and State of Mind" . South China Morning Post''. April 29, 2014. Retrieved July 14, 2015.

External links

Profile at China Vitae

Corpus of Political Speeches :Free access to political speeches by Zhu Rongji and other Chinese politicians, developed by Hong Kong Baptist University Library

Premiers of the People's Republic of China
Governors of the People's Bank of China
1928 births
Living people
 
Vice Premiers of the People's Republic of China
Chinese Communist Party politicians from Hunan
Mayors of Shanghai
Politicians from Changsha
Tsinghua University alumni
People's Republic of China politicians from Hunan
Members of the 15th Politburo Standing Committee of the Chinese Communist Party
20th-century Chinese heads of government
21st-century Chinese politicians
Members of the 14th Politburo Standing Committee of the Chinese Communist Party
Victims of the Anti-Rightist Campaign
Secretaries of the Communist Party Shanghai Committee